Moulvibazar Sadar is an upazila of Moulvibazar District in the Division of Sylhet, Bangladesh.

History

In ancient times, the region was known as Chandrapur or Chandrarajya. After the Conquest of Gour in 1303, many disciples of Shah Jalal such as Shah Mustafa migrated and settled in present-day Moulvibazar Sadar where they preached Islam to the local people. Mustafa would eventually succeed Raja Chandra Singh as the ruler of Chandrapur after marrying the Raja's daughter. Shah Farang and Shah Darang migrated to Bekhamura (Manumukh), Shah Kamaluddin to Kamalpur (Chowallish), Shah Wali Mahmud to Singkapon, Haji Ahmad Rasool to Ghorakhal (northeast of Hazari Bari), Shah Hilal to Hilalpur, and Babu Dawlat to Bibi Dawlat (Chhankhair).

In 1476, the Minister of Sylhet, Majlis Alam, and his father, Musa ibn Haji Amir, built the Goyghor Mosque. This mosque hosted shelter for the Afghan warrior, Khwaja Usman, in 1593 from the Subahdar of Mughal Bengal, Man Singh I.

In 1771, Moulvi Syed Qudratullah established a bazaar near the banks of the Manu River using his zamindari land. He started importing edible goods, such as fruits and vegetables opening up opportunities for people to purchase as well as sell. The location allowed easy access through river and land transport. The Sadar Upazila was first founded as Moulvibazar Thana in 1882. In 1912, there was an anti-British protest held in the village of Jagatshi, organised by Swami Dayananda. The anti-British Khilafat Movement in 1921 also spread to Moulvibazar and campaigners that were present included Chittaranjan Das, Hussain Ahmed Madani and Sarojini Naidu. In 1932, the Ali Amzad Government Girls' High School was opened as a public school.

During the Bangladesh Liberation War, armed resistance begun at the village of Srirainagar in Kanakpur on 27 March 1971. The Pakistani army was said to have made a surprise attack on the procession there in which two people were killed. The Naria massacre took place on 5 May in Upper Kagabala. On 20 December, a number of people were killed and wounded by mine explosions at the premises of the Moulvibazar Government High School. The thana was turned into an upazila in 1984. In 2005, the Saifur Rahman Stadium was established, acting as a multi-use arena fitting 15,000 people.

Geography
It has 40,573 households and total area 344.34 km2. It is bordered by Balaganj in the north, Rajnagar and Kamalganj in the east, Srimangal in the south and Nabiganj in the west.

Administration

Moulvibazar Sadar Upazila is divided into Moulvibazar Municipality and 12 union parishads: Akhailkura, Amtail, Chandnighat, Ekatuna, Giasnagar, Kamalpur, Kanakpur Union, Khalilpur, Monumukh, Mostafapur Union, Nazirabad, and Uparkagabala. The union parishads are subdivided into 196 mauzas and 429 villages.

Moulvibazar Municipality is subdivided into 9 wards and 48 mahallas.

Demographics

As of the 1991 Bangladesh census, Moulvibazar Sadar has a population of 239,378. It has now grown to 281,593 according to later censuses. Males constitute 51.56% of the population, and females 48.44%. Its over-18 population is 126,303. Most of the people are Muslims. There are over 45,000 Hindus, 150 Buddhists, 17 Christians and 319 of other faiths.

Education
According to Banglapedia, Ali Amzad Government Girls' High School, founded in 1932, is a notable secondary school. Moulvibazar Sadar has an average literacy rate of 48.6%. The literacy rate for the urban areas is 65.2% while in the rural areas it is 45.7%. The Upazila has 5 colleges as well as vocational, primary teacher, nurse, youth, blind welfare training institutes. It also has a co-operative institute, a horticulture research institute. There are 17 primary schools and 7 community and satellite schools, in addition to 16 kindergartens. In total, there are 42 madrasas.

Notable people
 Bajloor Rashid MBE, businessman and former president of the Bangladesh Caterers Association UK.
 Saifur Rahman, longest serving Finance Minister of Bangladesh.
 Shah Mustafa, associated with spreading Islam to Moulvibazar
 Syed Abdul Majid CIE, first native minister of Assam, pioneer of the agricultural industry
 Syed Qudratullah, founder of Moulvibazar
 Rangalal Sen, National Professor of Bangladesh.
 Syed Mohsin Ali, Former Member of the Jatiya Sangsad from Moulvibazar-3, Former Bangladesh Minister of Social Welfare and former President of Moulvibazar District Unit of Awami League. 
 Hosne Ara Wahid, Member of Parliament, lived in Moulvibazar.

See also
Upazilas of Bangladesh
Districts of Bangladesh
Divisions of Bangladesh

References